Kennett Township is a township in Chester County, Pennsylvania, United States.  It was the birthplace of Louise Brewer Shepard, the wife of the first American in space, Alan Shepard. The population was 8,289 at the 2020 census.

History
Chandler Mill Bridge, Joseph Gregg House, Hamorton Historic District, Harlan Log House, Old Kennett Meetinghouse, and the Wiley-Cloud House are listed on the National Register of Historic Places.

Geography
The northwest part of the township encircles the separate borough of Kennett Square, while the census-designated place of Hamorton is in the northeast part of the township.

Demographics

At the 2020 census, the township was 75.5% non-Hispanic White, 5.7% Black or African American, 0.0% Native American, 2.7% Asian, 0.0% Native Hawaiian or other Pacific Islander, and 2.2% were two or more races. 14.4% of the population were of Hispanic or Latino ancestry.

As of the 2020 census of 2020, there were 8,289 people, 3,308 households in the township.  The population density was 493.2 people per square mile.  The racial makeup of the township was 88.1% White, 5.7% African American, 0.0% Native American, 2.7% Asian, 0.0% Pacific Islander, and 2.2% from two or more races. Hispanic or Latino of any race were 14.4% of the population.

The township is home to a large and rapidly growing Hispanic (primarily Mexican) community.

In the township the population was spread out, with 5.7% under the age of 5, 21.3% under the age of 18, and 24.9% who were 65 years of age or older.  57.1% of the township population is female.

The median income for a household in the township was $118,520, with 6.4% of the township persons in poverty.

Current board of supervisors and township officials

 Richard Leff, Chairman of the Board
 Scudder Stevens, Vice Chair
 Geoffrey Gamble, Esq, Member 

 Eden Ratliff, Township Manager 
 Gretchen Porterfield, Executive Assistant
 Amy Heinrich, Township Treasurer
 Matthew Gordon, Chief of Police

Township Embezzlement Charges
In April 2019, township manager, Lisa Moore, was fired after allegations of theft and embezzlement came to light. On October 4, 2021, Moore appeared in Chester County Common Pleas Court and admitted she stole $3.249 million from township residents. The township’s once-trusted employee admitted to all that she had violated the trust placed in her. Her judicial presumption of innocence was removed by her guilty plea to five criminal counts, theft by deception, dealing in unlawful proceeds, forgery, tampering with public records and access device fraud. Moore was ordered to repay the full $3.249 million she stole from the township.  In December 2021, the Township reported they had recovered $1.7 million, which includes a cash settlement of $1.27 million from Moore, $355,000 from the sale of Moore's house, and $83,000 that a recovery team located and seized from Moore's personal account. The Township is still looking to recover $1.5 million.

Transportation

U.S. Route 1 is the most prominent highway serving Kennett Township. It follows the Kennett-Oxford Bypass and Baltimore Pike on a west-east alignment along the northern edge of the township. Pennsylvania Route 41 follows Gap Newport Pike along a northwest-southeast alignment across the southwestern corner of the township. Pennsylvania Route 52 follows Kennett Pike, Baltimore Pike and Lenape Road along a northwest-southeast alignment across the northeastern part of the township, including a short concurrency with US 1. Finally, Pennsylvania Route 82 follows Creek Road and Union Street along a northwest-southeast alignment through western portions of the township.

References

External links

Kennett Township

Townships in Chester County, Pennsylvania
Townships in Pennsylvania